Corinth Holders High School opened in the fall of 2010. It is a part of Johnston County School District.

References

External links

Schools in Johnston County, North Carolina
2010 establishments in North Carolina
Educational institutions established in 2010

Public high schools in North Carolina